Bulldozer, found its way into the election and political lexicon of Uttar Pradesh, and further across India, after its massive political use by Uttar Pradesh chief minister Yogi Adityanath. While bulldozers are routinely used across India to remove illegal construction, the bulldozer in this case has been used as an extrajudicial tool, a power statement, against criminals and communal violence rioters and accused criminals. Following its usage in political messaging in Uttar Pradesh, the bulldozer was used in Madhya Pradesh to convey political messages aimed at showing a strong stance against criminals. Narratives conveyed that a lot of the usage of the bulldozer was itself communal in nature.

Its rhetoric usage by chief minister Yogi Adityanath of the Bhartiya Janata Party started following the commencement of his first term in office from March 2017. By 2020 property belonging to numerous criminals including Vikas Dubey, and politician-strongmen and gangsters Mukhtar Ansari and Atique Ahmed had been demolished using bulldozers. The action against Dubey started after he and his associates killed eight policemen in July 2020 during an attempted arrest. The Yogi government claims of freeing up  of government land and other illegally occupied land by land mafia. The UP government issued certain directives related to the use of bulldozers, and also warned of their misuse. Yogi began his second term as chief minister in March 2022. In a similar manner, the chief minister of Madhya Pradesh, another state with a CM from BJP, began usage of the bulldozer in March 2022 against properties of mafia, and accused rapists and rioters. By late-April 2022 bulldozers had also been used on the property of rioters in Delhi and Gujarat, with politics and legal issues ensuing, including over anti-encroachment drives in Rajasthan, a Congress state, but in a BJP held municipality. In Uttarakhand rioters during Hanuman Jayanti processions were threatened with bulldozers parked in the vicinity of property owned by the accused.

Course of events

Uttar Pradesh

Usage against criminals 
Yogi Adityanath started his first term as the Chief Minister of Uttar Pradesh in March 2017. His first announcement was that his government would clean up the law and order situation in the state among other connected issues. An anti-mafia task force was set up and political messaging included statements such as "Leave UP or go to jail". It was in September 2017 when Yogi first warned that he would bulldoze properties of those involved in crime, "My government will bulldoze houses of anyone even thinking of perpetuating crime against women and weaker sections of the society", adding that it would take some more time to reel in other criminal elements. Uttar Pradesh police had already started taking action against criminals with a number of them dying in police encounters.

By the end of 2020 properties had been demolished. In July 2020 history-sheeter and crime boss Vikas Dubey's house was demolished along with four vehicles. A few days eight policemen had been killed in an attempted arrest in which Dubey was the main accused. Vikas Dubey would go on to die in an encounter after the police vehicle carrying him met with an accident. In August 2020 Mukhtar Ansari, a criminal turned politician, connected properties were razed. A government spokesperson explained that the property had been constructed on property of migrants in Pakistan. Ansari's sons property was razed. This involved 250 policemen and 20 bulldozers. Part of a hotel he owned was demolished following a decision taken by an administrative board including the district magistrate. In September 2020, properties connected to Atique Ahmed were demolished. This includes Mohamed Zaid's two-story house built in 2015 over 600 square yards. 6 bulldozers took 5 hours. The reason given for demolishing the building was that the blueprints of the building were not cleared by local authorities before construction. A number of other structures, illegal constructions, or belonging to known gangsters were also raised. This number increased by the end of 2021. In February 2021, Yogi stated that  of land had been freed from mafia control. Yogi said that the illegal properties that are being seized and bulldozed will be replaced by new houses for the Dalits and the poor, playgrounds and other social needs, and warned the mafia of harassing the poor, farmers and traders. Public response within Uttar Pradesh in relation to the use of the bulldozer has been mixed. The Yogi government has also warned about the misuse of bulldozers.

Elections 
Yogi Adityanath went on to use the bulldozer in his election campaign for the 2022 Uttar Pradesh Legislative Assembly election held between 10 February to 7 March 2022. This earned him the tag "bulldozer baba". The term had initially been used as a taunt by an opposition party. In some rallies Yogi also mentioned "bulldozers taking rest".

Madhya Pradesh 
Shivraj Singh Chauhan, the chief minister of Madhya Pradesh, another state with a BJP CM, went on to use the bulldozer in a similar manner was seen in Uttar Pradesh. By 19 March, CM Chauhan had ordered the use of the bulldozer against property of the mafia as well as against gang rape, rioting and kidnapping accused in Seoni, Sheopur, Jaora, Shahdol and Raisen. The Shahdol rape incident took place on 16 March and the house of the accused was demolished on 22 March. This was following an investigation by the chief municipality officer who found a number of illegalities in the construction of the house. Following clashes on Holi in Khamriya village of Raisen, the administration used bulldozers to demolish encroachments of accused rioters. Many of alleged perps were of a "particular community". In a similar manner as the tag given to Yogi "bulldozer baba", banners were seen in Bhopal with "bulldozer mama" written and an image of CM Chauhan and a bulldozer in the background.

Following a rape incident on 28 March in a government guesthouse in Rewa, CM Chauhan ordered a bulldozer to be used against the house of the accused, a Mahant. Following clashes in Khargone on 10 April 2022, Ram Navami, 16 houses and 29 shops were demolished by Chouhan's government. Some of the demolished buildings were constructed under the government housing initiative Pradhan Mantri Awas Yojana.

Karanataka and Uttarakhand 
On 16 April, localized riots took place in Hubli, Karnataka. Following violence, there were calls in the state demanding "bulldozer" form of justice. On the same day violence was also seen in Uttarakhand's Bhagwanpur region. In the following days bulldozers were seen in proximity to properties of the riot accused.

Jahangirpuri 
On 20 April, following communal violence in Delhi's Jahangirpuri, local authorities issued demolition of certain structures in an eviction and anti-encroachment drive. The Supreme Court of India intervened to stop the demolition. Supposedly the Supreme Court had to give the orders twice as demolition continued for around an hour after the first order. Street carts were also destroyed with bulldozers. Residents said that even registered buildings were damaged. Nine bulldozers were seen in the area and 20 structures destroyed. A political blame game ensued.

Rajasthan 
On 22 April, bulldozers were seen demolishing some shops and three temples in Alwar, Rajasthan, a Congress led state but in the BJP held municipality of Rajgarh. Local administration said that consensus had been achieved in the destruction of the shrines, including one which had been built on a drain, and that it was part of an anti-encroachment drive and the shrines would be rebuilt on "non-controversial land". During another anti-encroachment drive the next day a gaushala was part of the removed structures and cleared land.

Legal issues

On Jahangirpuri 
Tushar Mehta, on behalf of North Delhi Municipal Corporation, stated that the Delhi Municipal Corporation Act provides for removal of "stall, chair, bench, box, ladder, bale" without notice. Just as Ganesh Gupta's juice shop was removed without notice, everything on public land was removed. In the case of buildings, notices were given. Further the law provides some days and appellate remedy in the case of building as per the Act. As "houses and other permanent structures were targeted" Advocate Dushyant Dave raised this as a primary point before the court.

Reactions 
Farm leader and national spokesperson of the Bharatiya Kisan Union (BKU) Rakesh Tikait warned the government that if the unjust use of bulldozers doesn't stop, tractors will be used by farmers to stop them. Opposition leaders in response also stated the headquarters of BJP should be demolished and that it was BJP who allowed illegal constructions in Delhi in areas they had held for years. Akhilesh Yadav said that BJP should make the bulldozer its emblem and that it was distracting the Chief Minister from more important governance matters. Manish Sisodia said that the bulldozer was being used as a tool of extortion. Names such as "Bulldozernath" or "the lord of bulldozers" were used. The bulldozer was connected to bulldozing the "dreams of the youth" and being "anti-women". Jamiat Ulama-e-Hind filed two petitions in the Supreme Court of India. On 24 April 2022, Aam Aadmi Party conducted "foot marches" in all the wards of Delhi. Brinda Karat, an Indian politician, has claimed that BJP aims to vilify Muslims through these actions.

Newslaundry, an Indian media watchdog, reported on the response of sections of the Indian media and their coverage of the events and how certain anchors supported the proceedings. Anjana Om Kashyap, a media professional, climbed on board the bulldozers at the Jahangirpuri site and started asking the drivers questions. During one of the demolitions in Uttar Pradesh, a district magistrate (an Indian Administrative Service officer) clicked a selfie, and shared it with the caption "" ( This is us, this is our car, our party is happening here).

Commentary 
The timing of the Jahangirpuri demolitions, four days after communal clashes in the same area, "reads extremely suspicious", says political commentator N. S. Moorthy . The Supreme Court status quo intervention brought immediate relief. However this order does not seem to make the judiciary the answer to the larger overarching questions related to the perceived targeting of sections of the population, more that what is already being seen.

See also 
 Uttar Pradesh Recovery of Damages to Public and Private Property Ordinance, 2020
 2022 Jahangirpuri violence
 Ram Navami riots
 Illegal housing in India
 Turkman gate demolition and rioting

References 
Notes

Citations

Further reading

External links 
 Cartoons via ThePrint
 Cartoons via TheScroll.in
 Video of a demolition

Politics of India
Politics of Uttar Pradesh
Crime in Uttar Pradesh
Politics of Madhya Pradesh
Crime in Madhya Pradesh
Yogi Adityanath